Muyang is an Afro-Asiatic language spoken in and near the town of Tokombéré in the department of Mayo-Sava in northern Cameroon.

The Muyang (15,000 speakers) traditionally inhabit the Muyang massif and the neighboring massifs of Mougouba, Gouadagouada, and Palbarar, which are inselbergs in the plain northeast of Tokombéré (in Mouyengué and Palbara-Goudouba cantons of Tokombéré arrondissement, Mayo-Sava department, Far North Region).

References

External links 

 Muyang Provisional Lexicon A dictionary of words in the Muyang language

Biu-Mandara languages
Languages of Cameroon